Phillip R. Ryan (born August 10, 1945) is a former Texas Ranger and the three-term Sheriff of Wise County, Texas.  He entered law enforcement in 1966 at age 21, initially serving as a police officer in Pasadena in Harris County, Texas.  He later joined the Texas Department of Public Safety as a highway patrolman assigned to Houston and Cleveland, Texas.  In 1976, he was promoted to highway patrol sergeant, which took him to Humble, Texas.  He applied for and was accepted to service in the Texas Ranger Division and served as a Ranger in Decatur, which also covered Jack, Montague, and Clay counties.

As a Texas Ranger, Ryan worked many cases that made him well known not only throughout the state, but throughout the nation.  He is most notable for his arrest of serial killer Henry Lee Lucas, but also was the Texas Ranger assigned to the Ricky Lee and Sharon Green case, two of the most notorious serial killers in Wise County, Texas history.

Wise County Sheriff
After retiring from law enforcement, Ryan entered the private sector, but this would only last for a short time.  In 1992, Ryan began his campaign for Wise County Sheriff, running on the Democratic ballot.  On March 20, 1992, he took his oath of office for the first of three terms as sheriff.  Under his leadership, the department instituted a new crime prevention division, implemented a county-wide Crime Stoppers program, and improved information technology.

Walker, Texas Ranger
Ryan was a technical consultant to the CBS television series, Walker, Texas Ranger, starring Chuck Norris. He briefly appeared in Little Texas' "God Blessed Texas" video with two other Texas Rangers.  He also appeared extensively in the 1995 documentary film, The Serial Killers and the 1995 television documentary Henry Lee Lucas: The Confession Killer.

Personal life
Ryan is married to the former Sidney Calvert, his fourth wife.  He has three children from his first marriage, Phillip Ryan Jr., a police officer in East Texas and former Texas death row prison guard, Ronda Ryan Schweiger of Houston, Texas, and Daryle Ryan, a former San Antonio police officer.  As of May 2015, he is retired in Decatur, Texas, where he is a security consultant to private businesses.

Notes

External links
 Former Texas Rangers Association, where Ryan serves as a Director
 Official site of the Texas Rangers law enforcement agency
 Texas Rangers Hall of Fame and Museum

1945 births
Living people
Politicians from Oklahoma
People from Pasadena, Texas
People from Cleveland, Texas
People from Decatur, Texas
American municipal police officers
Members of the Texas Ranger Division
Texas sheriffs